David Wiley Rennick (born 8 January 1983) is an Australian singer-songwriter. Rennick is the co-front man and songwriter for indie rock band Dappled Cities and is also the founder and songwriter for indie super-group The Curse of Company. 2014 saw him performing solo under the name of Light Pressure releasing the tracks French Alps and U Know Me.

Discography

Albums 
with Dappled Cities
A Smile (18 October 2004)
Granddance (11 November 2006)
Zounds (15 August 2009) No. 48 AUS
Lake Air (21 July 2012) No. 41 AUS
Many Roads (17 January 2014)

 with The Curse Of Company
Leo Magnets Joins A Gang (17 June 2008)

Extended plays
with Dappled Cities
 Dead Bodies Where Their Mouths Were (2003)
 Wimbo Park (2004) - New Zealand-only
 Die in Your Eyes (2005) - Split EP with the Tucker B's
 A Crooked Smile (2006) - Remix EP

Singles 
with Dappled Cities
 "Be Engine"/"Sputnik" (2002)
 "Chameleon Girl" (2003)
 "Peach" (2004)
 "Cream" (2004)
 "Fire Fire Fire" (2006)
 "Vision Bell" (2007)
 "Work It Out" (2007)
 "The Price" (2009)
 "Run with the Wind" (2012)
 "Born At The Right Time" (2012)
 "Many Roads" (2013)

with The Curse Of Company
 "All The Mines" (2008)
 "Homecoming" (2008)

as Light Pressure
 U Know Me (2014)
 Silverland (2014)

References 

1983 births
Australian singer-songwriters
Living people
21st-century Australian singers